The 2014 Nagano gubernatorial election was held on 10 August 2014 to elect the next governor of , a prefecture of Japan located in the Chūbu region of Honshu island. Incumbent Governor Shuichi Abe was re-elected for a second term, defeating Shumpo Noguchi with 84.22% of the vote.

Candidates  

Shuichi Abe, 53, incumbent since 2010, bureaucrat, former Nagano vice governor (2001-2004). Backed by DPJ, he was also supported by LDP, Yui no To, Komeito, SDP and Kokoro.
Shumpo Noguchi, 71, honorary professor at Shinshu University. Presented by the JCP.
Takashi Negami, 64, a company president.

Results

References 

2014 elections in Japan
Nagano gubernational elections
Politics of Nagano Prefecture